La Leche League International (LLLI) is a non-governmental, nonprofit organization that organizes advocacy, education, and training related to breastfeeding. It is present in about 89 countries.

The aim of the charity is to provide mother to mother support and recognize the importance of mothering through breastfeeding, especially in social cultures where motherhood and breastfeeding are often not valued. This includes a mixture of modern family set ups and feeding options, and major efforts have been made in recent years by the charity to improve diversity and equality so it is accessible to all who seek support with their breastfeeding goals.

History
The organization was founded in 1956 by Marian Tompson, Mary White, Mary Ann Cahill, Edwina Froehlich, Mary Ann Kerwin, Viola Lennon, and Betty Wagner.  Later, other professionals joined and supported the group - Dr. Herbert Ratner and Dr. Gregory White. Herbert Ratner was influential in expanding the organization's philosophy beyond breastfeeding. At the time, most women in the United States bottle-fed their babies. At the time the organization was founded, only 20% of babies were breastfeeding in the United States. The first formal La Leche League meeting was held on October 17, 1956, in Illinois. The seven Leaders originally held meetings in private homes; more recently, hospitals, parenting centers, and other public venues have provided meeting spaces. In 1957, Dr. Grantly Dick-Read, considered the father of the natural childbirth movement, also came to speak with them. The first La Leche League Group outside of the United States formed in 1960 in Jonquiere, Quebec, Canada. The La Leche League became La Leche League International, Inc. (LLLI) in 1964 with groups in Canada, Mexico and New Zealand. In 1964 the first international conference was held in Chicago with 425 adults and 100 babies in attendance.

In 1981 LLLI was granted consultative status with the United Nations Children's Fund (UNICEF). In 1985 LLLI served on the International Board of Lactation Consultant Examiners, established to develop and administer a voluntary certification program for lactation consultants. The first IBLCE exam was administered in July 1985.  The name "La Leche" comes from the Spanish word leche [pronounced leh-cheh] meaning milk. It was inspired by a shrine in St. Augustine, Florida, dedicated to "Nuestra Señora de la Leche y Buen Parto", meaning "Our Lady of Happy Delivery and Plentiful Milk".

Group meetings were held by a Leader, someone approved by LLLI to run the meetings and moderate the discussion that would take place. LLLI grew from a local, to a national, and then an international organization that has been helping thousands of mothers and babies all over the world for more than 60 years.

Philosophy and mission
The mission of LLLI is "to help mothers worldwide to breastfeed through mother-to-mother support, encouragement, information, and education, and to promote a better understanding of breastfeeding as an important element in the healthy development of the baby and mother."

The following are statements of LLLI's philosophy:
 Mothering through breastfeeding is the most natural and effective way of understanding and satisfying the needs of the baby.
 Mother and baby need to be together early and often to establish a satisfying relationship and an adequate milk supply.
 In the early years the baby has an intense need to be with his mother, which is as basic as its need for food.
 Human milk is the natural food for babies, uniquely meeting their changing needs. 
 For the healthy, full-term baby, breast milk is the only food necessary until the baby shows signs of needing solids, about the middle of the first year after birth.
 Ideally the breastfeeding relationship will continue until the baby outgrows the need.
 Alert and active participation by the mother in childbirth is a help in getting breastfeeding off to a good start.
 Breastfeeding is enhanced and the nursing couple sustained by the loving support, help, and companionship of the baby's father. A father's unique relationship with his baby is an important element in the child's development from early infancy.
 Good nutrition means eating a well-balanced and varied diet of foods in as close to their natural state as possible.
 From infancy on, children need loving guidance which reflects acceptance of their capabilities and sensitivity to their feelings.

LServices 
The primary purpose of LLLI is to encourage, inform, and support mothers primarily via meetings, telephone help, Skype, Facebook, W app, helpforms and e-mail. Some Leaders also do home and/or hospital visits.  LLLI leaders are accredited volunteers who have breastfed their own babies and have been specially trained to help mothers with breastfeeding. Leaders keep up-to-date through continued training and study of the most current medical research on breastfeeding.

Leaders organize group meetings, where mothers are encouraged to share their own experiences with other mothers. A common theme repeated by Leaders at a LLLI meeting is "take what you like and leave the rest," acknowledging that every mother-baby dyad is unique and each mother knows her own baby best.  In most countries with a LLL-presence, Leaders also offer telephone help, online meetings, Facebook groups, email help and several types of personal help.

In some locales, there is a centralized phone number (for an entire country or a US state, for example) where mothers can either receive help directly or be referred to a Leader in her area. In other areas, these Leaders directly publicize their telephone numbers, and sometimes e-mail addresses, via the LLLI website, FB groups, telephone directories, and posters in parenting centres, libraries, physicians' and midwives' offices, health centres and other places where pregnant women and new parents might seek information. Mothers may also submit questions or concerns through online Help Forms available on the LLLI website.

The last LLLI International Conference took place July 2007 in Chicago, and included a seminar for health care professionals. Currently emphasis is on Area parenting and nursing conferences, held in many parts of the world every year. Some Areas offer continuing education seminars for health care professionals in addition to ongoing training for Leaders.

Currently LLLI publishes a bimonthly nursing and parenting journal, Breastfeeding Today, available online and by link to members worldwide. LLLI's core publications are The Womanly Art of Breastfeeding (now in its 8th edition), "Feed Yourself Feed Your Family" and "Sweet Sleep".

International
La Leche League International is a core partner starting the World Alliance for Breastfeeding Action (WABA).

Argentina
Liga de La Leche Argentina was founded in 1978.

Austria

La Leche League Österreich was founded in 1979.

Belgium/Flanders

La Leche League Vlaanderen was founded in 2011.

Belarus

Olga Prominski founded La Leche League of Belarus in 2011.

Bulgaria
Tanya Ruseva became the first La Leche League Leader in Bulgaria in 2005.

La Leche League of Bulgaria established the first website in the country dedicated solely to breastfeeding. They publish the first and only breastfeeding magazine for both parents and healthcare workers. They are the sole providers of breastfeeding webinars and organized the first international breastfeeding conference in Bulgaria.

Canada

The first LLL Group outside of USA, founded in Jonquiere, Quebec.

China

LLL China has been active since 1995 and is currently in Beijing, Shanghai, Chengdu, Qingdao, Suzhou, Hong Kong, and Guangzhou with meetings offered in both English and Chinese.

Dominican Republic
Liga de La Leche, Dominican Republic was born in 1990. The founding mothers of LLL in the country were Priscilla Stothers, a nurse and health educator from Florida, USA, and Yanet Olivares, who was accredited as a LLL Leader in Puerto Rico before she returned to her own country, the Dominican Republic.

France

The first meetings of LLL of France were held in 1973. LLL of France was officially created in 1979.  The founding mother of LLL of France was Suzanne Colson. Dr. Colson, PhD, a midwife, is widely known for her research of neonatal reflexes in connection to breastfeeding.

Germany

The first meetings of La Leche League in Germany were held at American military bases in the 1970s. The first German Leaders were Edda Langmann from Fulda and Hannah Lothrop. April 30, 1977, is the official birthday of La Leche Liga Deutschland.

Great Britain

La Leche League came to Great Britain in the early 1970s. The first group in GB was started in Leicester in 1973 by an American Leader, Anne Harrison, who was living in Britain. Toward the end of the 1970s, it was suggested that LLLGB become an autonomous organization. It would remain affiliated to LLLI and would be identical or very similar in structure with the same commitments to the same mothering philosophy. The philosophy would remain intact, along with the structure of meetings, and Leader support.

During 1980 discussions continued and a meeting in April decided that La Leche League could best meet the needs of mothers and babies in Britain as a fully autonomous organisation with a democratically elected Board of Directors, ideally affiliated with LLLI. There were approximately 70 Leaders at this time and this was the majority view with a minority feeling few changes were necessary.

Some Leaders had gone ahead with a decision to set up a separate organisation and on July 2, 1980, the inaugural meeting was held of the Association of Nursing Mothers which then formed a break-away group.

LLL GB maintains links with LLL Europe, including Future Areas in Europe, LLL International Division (ID) and the other Affiliates as well as LLL International. In the UK there are around 260 Leaders and 65 groups.

Greece

LLL Greece or Syndesmos Thilasmou Ellados (Σύνδεσμος Θηλασμού Ελλάδος) was officially founded in 1979.

Ireland

La Leche League Ireland was founded in Dublin in 1966 by the biologist and botanist Nora (Norah) A. Leach.

Israel 

LLL Israel was established in 1980 and currently has over 60 active Leaders and 24 support groups throughout the country as well as a hotline, forum, and Facebook groups. On July 5, 2016, it was recognized in the Knesset (Israeli parliament) for its contribution to women's health.

Italy

LLL Italy was officially founded in Milan in 1979 by a group of mothers and Leaders Shanda Bertelli and Rosalind Nesticò. Today it is based in Rome, with more than 120 active Leaders and is part of many working groups on breastfeeding including that of the Italian Ministry of Health.

Lebanon

In January 2012, La Leche League of Lebanon was founded by Nadiya Dragan. Tamara Drenttel Brand joined her at the end of 2012. In 2015, three more leaders became accredited and joined the ranks of LLL Lebanon: Sara Luis Hannan, Joelle Farkh and Mirna El-Sabbagh.

Netherlands

La Leche League Nederland was started in 1976 by Marijke Wisse.

Norway

In 1968 Elisabet Helsing started a mother-to-mother nursing support organization called  (meaning breastfeeding help). This started revival of nursing in Norway. Today Norway is known for the high initiation rates of breastfeeding.

Russia

LLL-Leader Natalia Gerbeda-Wilson of Ukraine and a Leader Applicant Marina Kopylova of Russia started a Yahoo mailing list Kormlenie [Russian for "breastfeeding") in 2003 to unite mothers who were helping other mothers breastfeed. The organization of natural feeding consultants called AKEV (Association of Natural Feeding Constulants, Russian for Ассоциация консультантов по естественному вскармливанию) was born on the mailing list in 2004. LLL-Leaders sent LLLI literature that had strong influence on AKEV principles of work.

Ekaterina Lokshina became the first LLL Leader in Russia. In 2012 the first Russian-language edition of The Womanly Art of Breastfeeding was published in Moscow, Russia.

Serbia

La Leche League of Serbia was founded in April 2011 by Marija Taraba.

Sweden

In 1973, the Swedish organization Amningshjalpen was formed following the Norwegian model, which in turn was inspired by LLL signature publication The Womanly Art of Breastfeeding.

Ukraine
La Leche League Ukraine was founded in 2006. At the end of 2015 La Leche League of Ukraine ceased to exist.

United States

LLL USA was founded in 2009, after an internal reorganization of La Leche League International. LLL-USA is the largest LLL-Area in the world.

Prominent (former) LLL-Leaders

Kathleen Bruce and Kathleen Auerbach, both LLL Leaders, in 1995 started LACTNET, a network for nursing educators and advocates worldwide to share information, discussion and support focusing on best practices, emerging thoughts and current research.
Barbara Heiser, a LLL Leader, co-founded the National Allisance of Breastfeeding Advocacy (NABA).
Kay Hoover and Barbara Wilson-Clay, LLL Leaders and IBCLCs, wrote The Breastfeeding Atlas, a comprehensive visual guide for lactation specialists.
Valerie McClaine, an LLL Leader, has been raising awareness about human milk patenting.
Nancy Mohrbaher ~ a LLL Leader, IBCLC, FILCA. A co-author with Julie Stock of Breastfeeding Answer Book, one of the first most definitive references for lactation counselors. The book was first published in 1991, then revised in 1996 and 2003. Mohrbacher later wrote Breastfeeding Answers Made Simple: A Guide for Helping Mothers (with Kathleen Kendall-Tackett) and Breastfeeding Made Simple: Seven Natural Laws for Nursing Mothers.
Audrey Naylor, MD and a member of the LLLI Professional Advisory Board relied on the organization's resources in training health care workers around the world through Wellstart International, the nonprofit educational organization she founded in 1983.
Peggy O'Mara, a LLL Leader, is famous as a publisher, editor and owner of Mothering magazine. She is the author of several books: Having a Baby Naturally: The Mothering Magazine Guide to Pregnancy and Childbirth; Natural Family Living: The Mothering Magazine Guide to Parenting; The Way Back Home: Essays on Life and Family; A Quiet Place: Essays on Life and Family.
Barbara Popper and Elizabeth Hormann, both LLL Leaders, founded Children In Hospitals (CIH), a non-profit, volunteer educational and advocacy organization. CIH conducted a survey of visitation policies at other hospitals, and used the information to advocate for 24-hour family visitation policies at Massachusetts hospitals. http://fcsn.org/newsline/v30n2/mchbda.php
 Jan Riordan ~ a LLL Leader, RN, EdD, IBCLC, co-authored Breastfeeding and Human Lactation, one of the main texts on breastfeeding education, with Katherine G. Auerbach, PhD, LLL Leader, in 1993 and 1996, and with Karen Wambach in 2009.
Nancy Wainer Cohen, a LLL Leader, coined the term VBAC (vaginal birth after cesarean) and has written two books on cesarean prevention. Silent Knife (with Lois J. Estner) won an award for The Best Book in the Field of Health and Medicine by the American Library Association the year it was written. She co-founded the world's first cesarean prevention organization and her work is being archived at the Schlesinger Women's History Library at Harvard University.
Marian Tompson, a co-founder of LLL, founded AnotherLook, an organization advocating research of breastfeeding in the context of HIV.
Diana West, LLL Leader, IBCLC wrote Defining Your Own Success: Breastfeeding after Breast Reduction Surgery and The Breastfeeding Mother's Guide to Making More Milk (with Lisa Marasco, LLL Leader, IBCLC, FILCA).
In 1979 Chele Marmet and Ellen Shell, both LLL Leaders in California, opened the Lactation Institute, the first program in the US providing education specifically for lactation consultants. The program became a model for the emerging lactation consultant profession.
In 1982 LLLI established a Lactation Consultant Department under the leadership of LLL Leader JoAnne Scott, assisted by Linda Smith, Judy Good, Chele Marmet, and other LLL Leaders. JoAnne Scott, Linda Smith, Chele Marmet, Judy Good, Jan Riordan and others jointly designed a certification program that established worldwide lactation consultant competency standard.
In 1987 LLLI together with Women, Infants, and Children (WIC) agency, the Chicago Board of Health kicked off the first official Peer Counselor Training Program, reaching out to women of various races and socio-economic groups that LLL did not reach through its help.
 In 1996 La Leche League became one of the three partners in LINKAGES, a worldwide government project to promote nursing, appropriate complementary feeding, and maternal dietary practices in six developing countries.
Trevor MacDonald was the first man to be accredited as an LLL Leader in 2016.

References

External links
La Leche League International
LLLI archive at DePaul University's Special Collections and Archives
La Leche League Bulgaria
La Leche Liga Deutschland
LLL Israel
La Leche League Italy
Amningshjalpen

1956 establishments in Illinois
Babycare
Breastfeeding advocacy
Breastfeeding organizations
Breastfeeding
DePaul University Special Collections and Archives holdings
Franklin Park, Illinois
Non-profit organizations based in Illinois
Organizations based in Raleigh, North Carolina
Organizations established in 1956
Parenting skills organizations